Tögrög is a sum (district) of Govi-Altai Province in western Mongolia. Center of Tugrug sum located from Altai city in 145 km. In 2009, its population was 1,914.

References 

https://www.panoramio.com/user/997462/tags/GA_Tugrug_sum

Populated places in Mongolia
Districts of Govi-Altai Province